In Your Eyes is the second solo studio album by James "D-Train" Williams, known also as part of the American urban/post-disco group D-Train. The record was released in 1988 by Columbia Records in the US and via CBS Records in the United Kingdom. The album's biggest hit single, "In Your Eyes" was a number 11 R&B hit in Billboard. The album itself reached number 46 on Billboard's R&B albums chart.

In Your Eyes was remastered and expanded by "Funky Town Grooves" in 2011 including 4 bonus tracks.

Track listing

(*) Bonus tracks on the remastered version.

References

External links
 James "D-Train" Williams - In Your Eyes (Expanded Edition) (CD, Album) at Discogs

1988 albums
D Train (entertainer) albums
Columbia Records albums